The 2015–16 Delaware Fightin' Blue Hens women's basketball team represents the University of Delaware during the 2015–16 NCAA Division I women's basketball season. The Fightin' Blue Hens, led by twentieth year head coach Tina Martin, play their home games at the Bob Carpenter Center and were members of the Colonial Athletic Association. They finished the season 15–17, 8–10 CAA play to finish in fifth place. They advanced to the semifinals of the CAA women's tournament where they lost to James Madison.

Roster

Schedule

|-
!colspan=9 style="background:#00539f; color:#FFD200;"| Non-conference regular season

|-
!colspan=9 style="background:#00539f; color:#FFD200;"| CAA regular season

|-
!colspan=9 style="background:#00539f; color:#FFD200;"| CAA Women's Tournament

See also
2015–16 Delaware Fightin' Blue Hens men's basketball team

References

External links

Delaware Fightin' Blue Hens women's basketball seasons
Delaware
Delaware Fightin' Blue Hens women's basketball
Delaware Fightin' Blue Hens women's basketball